Maciej Kamiński (born 15 May 1959) is a former Polish footballer who played as a midfielder.

Biography

Kamiński began his career playing with the youth levels at Noteć Inowrocław, eventually progressing into the first team. During the 1975–76 season Kamiński was involved in Noteć's promotion winning squad from the regional leagues. After this season Kamiński joined Goplania Inowrocław, spending three seasons with the club. In 1979 he moved to Bydgoszcz, firstly playing with Zawisza Bydgoszcz for a season before joining Polonia Bydgoszcz for three seasons.

In 1983 Kamiński joined Lechia Gdańsk, making his debut on 30 July 1983 in the Polish SuperCup final against Lech Poznań. Lechia won by beating the Polish champions Lech Poznań 1–0, with Kamiński playing the full game. In his first season with Lechia he also played in both games as Lechia faced European footballing giants Juventus in a European competition due to the previous season's Polish Cup win. Lechia also won promotion to the top division that season by winning the II liga for the 1983–84 season. Kamiński became an important player for Lechia upon their promotion to the I liga, becoming a starter for the next 4 seasons. In total Kamiński went on to make 109 appearances in Poland's top division before they were relegated to the second division. After one more season with the club Kamiński decided to retire from playing football at the start of the 1989–90 season. In total for Lechia Kamiński went on to make 181 appearances and scored 23 goals in all competitions.

Honours

Lechia Gdańsk
Polish SuperCup: 1983
II liga (western group): 1983–84

References 

1959 births
Living people
Polish footballers
Zawisza Bydgoszcz players
Polonia Bydgoszcz players
Lechia Gdańsk players
Association football midfielders